The following highways are numbered 537:

Canada
Alberta Highway 537
 Ontario Highway 537

United States
 
 
 
 
 Texas State Highway Spur 537